Napoléon Charbonneau (February 12, 1853 – August 31, 1916) was a Canadian lawyer, judge, and politician.

Born in Côte-des-Neiges, Canada East, the son of Augustin Charbonneau and Julienne Dufort, Charbonneau studied law in the office of Trudel and Taillon and was admitted to the bar in January 1879. He practiced civil and commercial law in Montreal and was in partnership for several years with Hormisdas Pelletier. He first ran as the Liberal candidate for the House of Commons of Canada for the riding of Jacques Cartier in the 1887 election but was defeated.  He was elected in an 1895 by-election sitting about seven months and did not run in the 1896 election. In 1903 he was appointed a Puisne Judge of the Superior Court of the Province of Quebec.

References
 
 

1853 births
1916 deaths
Liberal Party of Canada MPs
Members of the House of Commons of Canada from Quebec
Judges in Quebec
Lawyers in Quebec
People from Côte-des-Neiges–Notre-Dame-de-Grâce